Rachel Aukes is an American horror / science fiction / fantasy novelist best known for the Deadland Saga. She is a Wattpad Star, her stories having over eight million reads. Aukes earliest five books and two short stories were released under the pen name Berinn Rae. Several of her books are self-published under Waypoint Books LLC, her publishing company. She was born in Manchester, Iowa, U.S.A. in 1972 and attended West Delaware high school. She received her undergraduate degree in Management Information Systems and Communications from University of Northern Iowa and a masters of public administration at Drake University. She is a member of the Horror Writers Association, the Science Fiction and Fantasy Writers of America, and the International Thriller Writers. She lives in the Midwest.

Selected works

Guardians of the Seven Seals series 
Paranormal Romance, written as Berinn Rae
 Knightfall (Crescent Moon Press, 2011)
 Hellbound (Crescent Moon Press, 2012)

Colliding Worlds Trilogy 
Science Fiction Romance, written as Berinn Rae
 Collision (Simon & Schuster, 2012), (Waypoint Books, 2018)
 Implosion (Simon & Schuster, 2013), (Waypoint Books, 2018)
 Explosion (Simon & Schuster, 2013), (Waypoint Books, 2018)

Deadland Saga 
Horror/Apocalyptic Science Fiction
This three-book series is a modern remake of Dante Alighieri's Divine Comedy with a zombie apocalypse twist. 
 100 Days in Deadland (Waypoint Books, 2013)
 Deadland's Harvest (Waypoint Books, 2014)
 Deadland Rising (Waypoint Books, 2014)

Fringe Series 
Science Fiction
 Fringe Runner (Waypoint Books, 2016)
 Fringe Station (Waypoint Books, 2016)
 Fringe Campaign (Waypoint Books, 2017)
 Fringe War (Waypoint Books, 2018)
 Fringe Legacy (Waypoint Books, 2019)

Tidy Guides 
Non-Fiction
 The Tidy Guide to Writing A Novel (Waypoint Books, 2018)
 The Tidy Guide to Self-Editing Your Novel (Waypoint Books, 2019)
 The Tidy Guide to Publishing Your Novel (Waypoint Books, 2019)

Bounty Hunter Series 
Post-Apocalyptic Science Fiction
 Bounty Hunter (Waypoint Books, 2020)
 Bounty Hunter: Dig Two Graves (Waypoint Books, 2020)
 Bounty Hunter: Nothing to Nobody (Waypoint Books, 2020)
 Bounty Hunter: Rake and Scrape (Waypoint Books, 2020)

Flight of the Javelin Series 
Science Fiction
 Black Sheep (Aethon Books, 2020)
 Free Station (Aethon Books, 2020)
 Rogue Planet (Aethon Books, 2020)

Space Troopers Series (co-written with Jamie McFarlane)
Science Fiction 
 Rebel's Call (Aethon Books, 2021)
 Rebel's Run (Aethon Books, 2021)
 Rebel's Strike (Aethon Books, 2022)

Waymaker Wars Series 
Science Fiction
 Space Junk (Aethon Books, 2022)
 Freezer Burn (Aethon Books, 2022)
 Malfunction Junction (Aethon Books, 2022)

Short fiction 
 Stealing Fate (Waypoint Books, 2012)
 Envy's Revenge, Tales from the SFR Brigade, Vol.1 anthology (2013)
 Beer, Bugs, and the End of the World, Stories On The Go (2014, ASIN B00R1GECO6)
 Cracked, At Hells Gates, Vol. 1 anthology (2015)
 Perfect, Fat Zombie anthology (Permuted Press, 2015)
 Control+Alt+Delete, Never Fear anthology (13Thirty Books, 2015)
 A Tale of Three Deaths, Out of Tune, Volume 2 anthology (Journalstone, 2016)
 Sweeton's Shangri-La, Run anthology (Seaside Publications, 2016)
 The Seeker, Imagines anthology (Gallery Books, 2016)
 Bat Johnson, the Mad Mortician of Mars, Pew! Pew! anthology (Wooden Pen Press, 2017)
 The Teardrop that became a Torrent, Galactic Frontiers anthology (Shatterhouse Press, 2017)
 The Fall of Fort Bragg, Missions from the Extinction Cycle Volume 1 anthology (Great Wave Publishing, 2019)
 Outpost 46: Deadwood, Missions from the Extinction Cycle Volume 2 anthology (Great Wave Publishing, 2019)
 Golems of War, The Expanding Universe Volume 5 anthology (LMBPN Publishing, 2019)
 Ragged Old Golem, We Dare: No Man's Land anthology (Theogony Books, 2021)
 The Bounty Hunter's Creed, We Dare: Wanted, Dead or Alive anthology (Theogony Books, 2022)
 Heavy Metal Night at the Met, Mega Metal Attack audio anthology (Soundbooth Audio, 2023)

Awards and honors 
 Named "Best of 2013" by Suspense Magazine (100 Days in Deadland)
 Named "Best Zombie Books" by Huffington Post (100 Days in Deadland)
 2013 RWA Silken Sands Star Award for Best Short Story (Stealing Fate)
 2012 Stealing Fate listed as a Recommended Read by USA Today
 2012 EPIC Award finalist for Best Fantasy Romance (Knightfall)
 2012 Bookie Award nominee for Best Fantasy Romance (Knightfall)

References

External links 
Rachel Aukes Official site
Half Fast Flying Adventures, LLC Official site

1972 births
Living people
21st-century American novelists
American horror novelists
People from Manchester, Iowa
University of Northern Iowa alumni
Drake University alumni
American women novelists
21st-century American women writers